Jan Hedengård (born 27 May 1963) is a Sweden volleyball player. He competed in the men's tournament at the 1988 Summer Olympics.

References

External links
 

1963 births
Living people
Swedish men's volleyball players
Olympic volleyball players of Sweden
Volleyball players at the 1988 Summer Olympics
Sportspeople from Malmö